Insaaf Main Karoongaa is a 1985 Hindi drama film directed by Shibu Mitra, produced by B.S. Seth and presented by S.K. Kapur. This film has Rajesh Khanna in the lead opposite Tina Munim and Padmini Kolhapure. It also features Joy Mukherjee in his final film role. It is a remake of the Malayalam movie Thushaaram and was started after the success of Souten with the same leading starcast of Khanna, Munim and Kolhapure. The film was a Golden jubilee hit upon its release.

Synopsis
"Insaaf Main Karoongaa" (meaning "I will deliver justice") became an obsessive point of directive in the mind of Captain Ravi Khanna, when his young, beautiful and loving wife committed suicide. Seema was an orphan whom Khanna fell in love with her. One night when Ravi goes out of city for one of his assignments, his wife Seema is raped and commits suicide.

After the suicide takes place, he manages to trace the person and becomes vindictive and shoots the culprit point blank and surrenders to military court.

At this juncture the whole scene changes. As the proceedings of the court were about to start, the news of culprit having survived gets broken to him. This makes the Captain more ferocious and gets provoked to become free, so that on an appropriate opportunity he could fulfill his urge to kill him.

Ravi flees from the army force and on the way he meets his friend Khan who gives him shelter. One night Ravi  and Khan decide to go to the hospital, where the culprit was convalescing from his wounds, so that they could kill him. But the Captain is not able to shoot him as some of the army officers see him and try him to capture him. Accidentally the culprit's daughter comes in the way. Ravi then takes hold of her so that he can escape from that place comfortably.

The Captain then decides that he will keep Pinky with him and make it look like a kidnapping and will drive the culprit that mad that he will himself surrender to police and accept that he was the person who drove his wife to commit suicide. The rest of the story is how Ravi  is able to catch the culprits and how a relation develops between Pinky and Ravi and what all problems Ravi has to face on his way to attain justice for his beloved late wife.

Cast
Rajesh Khanna as Captain Ravi Khanna	
Tina Munim as Seema Khanna
Padmini Kolhapure as Pinky Singh
Shakti Kapoor as Zafar Khan
Aruna Irani as Razia
Joy Mukherjee as Shamsher Singh
Om Shivpuri as Brigadier Singh
Chandrashekhar as Jagan
Tej Sapru as Captain Yunus
Bob Christo as Commander Bob

Music

References

External links
 

1985 films
Indian romance films
Films scored by Bappi Lahiri
1980s Hindi-language films
Hindi remakes of Malayalam films
Indian rape and revenge films
Films directed by Shibu Mitra
1980s romance films